Phantom (theatrical release name: Phantom Pailey) is a 2002 Malayalam action drama film directed by Biju Varkey. It stars Mammootty in the title role, and Manoj K. Jayan, Innocent, Nishanth Sagar, Nedumudi Venu and Lalu Alex in other pivotal roles.

Plot
Pailey has come from Irattupetta, a small village in rural Kerala to Mumbai with the hope of making it big in Bollywood as an actor. After many failed attempts, he becomes a stunt performer who becomes the stunt double for big stars. Due to his daredevil stunts he gets the name Phantom Pailey.

One day while shooting a helicopter fight scene, he falls down and gets injured. Pailey understands that once a stuntman gets injured, his career ends, but he is made of different stuff. He decides to take a break and then come back to Mumbai. He goes to a backward rural village of Kerala-Tamil Nadu border, called Pallikara where his younger brother Josekutty who is an officer at the local dam. But Pailey's real ambition is to rejuvenate himself and get his wound healed and then go back to Mumbai.

Soon after his arrival, an earthquake and landslide happen in the village and Pailey gets involved in a fight between the locals and outsiders. The villagers are used to these natural calamities and following their complaint, to prevent such frequent earthquakes government puts a court order that quarry work should be stopped immediately. The contractor who mints money out of the quarry, Annachi and his people are at loggerheads with the local people who are led by Gandhi Pillai and the church priest.

Josekutty is a budding artiste and he is in love with Pillai's niece Hema. When Jose goes to Hyderabad for a competition, his elder brother Pailey comes to get him married to Hema. In no time he wins over the villagers and cross swords with the bad guys. Soon Annachi brings a corrupt police officer Sebastin, who is a sadist and a lawbreaker who is a constant nuisance for the villagers and Pailey is his main target. With the help of Annachi, Sebastin murders Josekutty and then it is pay back time for Phantom Pailey.

Cast

Release
The film was released on 5 April 2002.

Soundtrack
Music: Deva, Lyrics: Gireesh Puthenchery
 Kurum kuzhal osai ... - KS Chithra
 Viral thottal [D] ... - KS Chithra P Jayachandran
 Sunu mithuvare ... - KJ Yesudas
 Maattupongal [D] ... - KS Chithra SP Balasubrahmanyam
 Viral thottaal [F] ... - KS Chithra
 Maattupponkal [M] ... - SP Balasubrahmanyam

References

External links
 

2002 films
2000s Malayalam-language films